Candice Sue Miller (née McDonald; born May 7, 1954) is an American politician serving as the Public Works Commissioner of Macomb County, Michigan since 2017. She also served as the Harrison Township Supervisor.

U.S. House of Representatives

Committee assignments
 United States House Committee on Administration (chairman)
In the 113th Congress, Representative Miller was appointed to serve as chairman of the Committee on House Administration (CHA), and in the 114th Congress she continued to serve as the committee's chair. CHA was established in 1947 and is charged with the oversight of federal elections and the day-to-day operations of the House of Representatives.

The committee has the responsibility to ensure that the House of Representatives runs in an effective and efficient manner, which is vital as we work to meet the many challenges facing this great nation. Most importantly, this committee has jurisdiction over the federal election process, and, as chairman, Representative Miller has been committed to making certain the committee enacts rules to ensure our nation continues to have open, free, and fair elections.

Under her leadership as chairman, the U.S. House received consecutive "clean" audits, demonstrating her commitment to transparency and accountability. She also played a major role in advancing legislation to end the practice of using millions of dollars in taxpayer funding to host political party conventions and, instead, redirected that funding for pediatric research. Working with House officers, she has helped to increase the availability of low-cost digital tools used by the House to improve the House's daily functions and reduce operating costs. She also oversaw the Committee's review of the report generated by the Bauer-Ginsberg Commission, which focused on utilizing good, local governance over elections and made recommendations on different ideas to help locals election administrators improve upon their own voting processes.
 Committee on Homeland Security
 Subcommittee on Border and Maritime Security
Representative Miller has served on the House Committee on Homeland Security since March 2008. Representative Miller is currently serving as vice chair of the full House Committee on Homeland Security and served as chairman of the Subcommittee on Border and Maritime Security from 2011 until February 2016. She is also serving as a member of the Subcommittee on Counterterrorism and Intelligence.

The federal government's first and foremost responsibility is to provide for our national defense, and our common defense begins with a secure homeland. The committee is charged with oversight of the Department of Homeland Security (DHS) and ensuring its primary focus remains on the protection of the American people.

As chairman of the Subcommittee on Border and Maritime Security, Representative Miller exercised effective oversight and initiated legislative efforts to ensure our nation's borders are adequately secured against international terrorist organizations, illegal immigration, drug and human smuggling, as well as the exploitation of the legitimate visa process.

During the 113th Congress, Representative Miller championed legislation to formally authorize Customs and Border Protection (CBP) and clarify the security mission of the agency for the first time since the Department of Homeland Security was created in 2002. The legislation passed the House on July 28, 2014. She has also long advocated for ways to strengthen the Department of Homeland Security's ability to identify and stop terrorists with western passports, authoring legislation in that would allow DHS to suspend a country's participation in the U.S. Visa Waiver Program if it fails to provide the U.S. with pertinent traveler information related to terror threats. Additionally, Representative Miller crafted legislation to increase oversight over the maritime security mission of DHS, as well as strengthen maritime security at home and abroad as we trade with our trusted partners.

In the 114th Congress, Representative Miller continued to push needed legislation that helped ensure we implement strong protections for our borders and global supply chain. Our nation's borders can and must be secured, and her goal has been to see that DHS is making progress to confront the threats of terrorism, cyber terrorism, and mismanagement of the department in these areas vital to our national security, and continuing to work towards a secure border and a safer homeland.

Michigan's 10th Congressional District is a border district. It is home to the Blue Water Bridge, which is the second-busiest border crossing on the northern tier; Selfridge Air National Guard Base, which has expanding missions in the area of homeland security; Coast Guard stations at Selfridge, Port Huron, and Harbor Beach; it borders Chemical Valley, which is one of the largest collections of petro-chemical operations in North America; the CN Rail Tunnel, which is the busiest rail artery in the U.S.; and is the genesis of important trade arteries, interstates I-94 and I-69.

Miller focused her efforts on building a stronger presence of homeland security assets at Selfridge, enhancing the security of our airways, roadways, railways, and waterways, in addition to securing our food and water supplies by enhancing Northern Border security.

The Committee on Homeland Security was established in 2002 to provide congressional oversight for the U.S. Department of Homeland Security and better protect the American people against a possible terrorist attack. Many of the programs at Selfridge and the armed service reserves throughout the 10th Congressional District fall under the purview of the U.S. Department of Homeland Security. The Committee on Homeland Security provides oversight for the department and handles issues dealing with transportation security, border and port security, critical infrastructure protection, cyber security, and science and technology, emergency preparedness, emerging threats, intelligence and information sharing, investigations, and management and procurement.
 Committee on Transportation and Infrastructure
 Subcommittee on Highways and Transit
 Subcommittee on Railroads, Pipelines, and Hazardous Materials
 Subcommittee on Water Resources and Environment

In 2007, Representative Miller was appointed to the full House Committee on Transportation and Infrastructure. Representative Miller is also a member of the Subcommittee on Railroads, Pipelines, and Hazardous Materials, the Subcommittee on Water Resources and Environment, as well as the Subcommittee on Aviation. Representative Miller is the only member from Michigan serving on this committee and takes seriously the need to advocate on behalf of Michigan to ensure the state is returned its fair share of tax dollars for many infrastructure needs. She believes all avenues of transportation, whether on land or on the sea, are important to improve, maintain, and support surrounding economic growth.

Michigan's 10th Congressional District is host to the Blue Water Bridge in Port Huron, which is the second most traveled border crossing in North America. It is a vital component of economic expansion not just for the district, but for the region, state, and nation. This committee allows her to offer enhanced oversight and influence to ensure this portal and others like it receive the federal attention they need and deserve.

In 2014, Representative Miller was appointed to the House Committee on Transportation and Infrastructure's Public-Private Partnership Special Panel. This panel was created to examine the current state of public-private partnerships (P3s) across all modes of transportation, economic development, public buildings, water, and maritime infrastructure and equipment, and make recommendations on balancing the needs of the public and private sectors when considering, developing, and implementing P3 projects to finance the Nation's infrastructure. As the only Michigan Member, her involvement was critical in examining innovative ways that P3s can benefit infrastructure projects in Michigan, such as the expansion of the Customs and Border Plaza at the Blue Water Bridge.

The committee also holds jurisdiction over water quality issues. Throughout her career in public service, protecting the Great Lakes has been one of Representative Miller's principal advocacies. She is a vocal proponent of policy designed to preserve and protect Michigan's most cherished natural resource. During the 113th Congress, as the only member of the committee from the state of Michigan, Miller tirelessly advocated for the Great Lakes during House and conference negotiations of the Water Resources Reform and Development Act (WRRDA) and secured the inclusion of her provision designating all ports and harbors on the Great Lakes as a single, comprehensive navigation system for budgeting purposes – the Great Lakes Navigation System – essentially allowing the Great Lakes ports and harbors to create a unified front when it comes to federal funding.

The committee has jurisdiction over all modes of transportation: aviation, maritime and waterborne transportation, highways, bridges, mass transit, and railroads. The committee also has jurisdiction over other aspects of our national infrastructure, such as clean water and waste water management, the transport of resources by pipeline, flood damage reduction, the management of federally owned real estate and public buildings, the development of economically depressed rural and urban areas, disaster preparedness and response, and hazardous materials transportation.

The committee's broad oversight portfolio includes many federal agencies, including the Department of Transportation, the U.S. Coast Guard, Amtrak, the Environmental Protection Agency, the Federal Emergency Management Agency, the General Services Administration, the Army Corps of Engineers, and others.

For the 110th Congress Miller was appointed to continue her service on the House Armed Services Committee and was added to the Transportation and Infrastructure Committee, which has jurisdiction over not only surface transportation but also water quality issues related to the Great Lakes. Miller was appointed to the House Committee on Homeland Security in March 2008 and has since left the House Armed Services Committee.
During the 108th Congress, the House Ethics Committee sent her letters of admonishment for having improperly attempted to influence the vote of fellow Michigan congressman Nick Smith on the House floor. She later told the Detroit Free Press, " can be intimidated by an overweight middle-age woman, that's too bad."

During the 2003 invasion of Iraq, Miller was a member of the Armed Services committee, and part of a "war room" team that relayed information from the Bush administration to Republican members, the news media, and the public.

Miller was a member of the Congressional Constitution Caucus.

Admonishment by House Ethics Committee
During the 108th Congress, Miller was admonished by the House Ethics Committee for improperly attempting to influence the vote of fellow Michigan Congressman Nick Smith on a Medicare vote.

Political positions
Miller is a signatory of Grover Norquist's Taxpayer Protection Pledge, which commits her to oppose tax increases.

Miller sat on the House Select Committee on Energy Independence and Global Warming and has praised President Obama for his stance on off-shore oil exploration. She supports selling oil and gas leases to help fund the research and development of alternative energy projects.

On August 31, 2011, Miller complained about the publication by WikiLeaks (a non-profit document archive organisation) of classified documents purloined from the United States government.

The latest release of stolen American secrets by the organization WikiLeaks once again proves that they are a terrorist operation that puts the lives of Americans and our allies at risk. Particularly contemptible and criminal is the release of the identities of sources of information to our nation from those working against despotic regimes or terrorist organizations. WikiLeaks can no longer say that they are anything more than an organization that aids and abets enemies of freedom. It is long past time for the Obama Administration to take decisive action to shut this criminal operation down and to bring those who steal and release America's secrets and put our allies at risk to justice.

On April 26, 2012, Miller voted for the controversial Cyber Intelligence Sharing and Protection Act. It passed the House of Representatives, but did not become law.

Sponsored legislation
In June 2013, Miller introduced legislation, the Great Lakes Navigation System Sustainability Act of 2013, to redefine how the Great Lakes are treated in the competition for United States government harbor maintenance funding, and to create the opportunity for recreational harbors to vie for federal funding as well.

Miller, along with Congresswoman Loretta Sanchez, introduced , the Biometric Exit Improvement Act of 2013. The bill would implement a biometric exit system that would monitor the exit of foreign visitors. The bill would require the Secretary of Homeland Security to implement a biometric exit system for ten airports and ten seaports, test the system for two years, and then implement the system nationwide.

Miller also introduced, on November 14, 2013, To amend the Federal Election Campaign Act to extend through 2018 the authority of the Federal Election Commission to impose civil money penalties on the basis of a schedule of penalties established and published by the commission, to expand such authority to certain other violations, and for other purposes. The bill would allow the FEC to continue to use a fee schedule to impose small fines on things such as late filings.

On January 10, 2014, Miller introduced the United States Customs and Border Protection Authorization Act (H.R. 3846; 113th Congress), a bill that would authorize the Customs and Border Protection (CBP) and its mission and direct the CBP in the United States Department of Homeland Security to establish standard procedures for addressing complaints made against CBP employees and to enhance training for CBP officers and agents. Miller said that "Today, the House passed legislation that provides the necessary statutory authorization that will protect the agency's mission by providing our officers and agents proper authorities to carry out their important work."

Miller also introduced a bill, the Visa Waiver Program Improvement Act of 2015 which has been criticized for casting US citizens of Arab, Iranian, and Muslim descent as second-class citizens in their own country – a "legislation that will effectively create two classes of Americans – Americans with Middle Eastern or Muslim background, and Americans without that background".

Miller was ranked as the 71st most bipartisan member of the U.S. House of Representatives during the 114th United States Congress (and the most bipartisan member of the U.S. House of Representatives from Michigan) in the Bipartisan Index created by The Lugar Center and the McCourt School of Public Policy that ranks members of the United States Congress by their degree of bipartisanship (by measuring the frequency each member's bills attract co-sponsors from the opposite party and each member's co-sponsorship of bills by members of the opposite party).

Opposed legislation
The bill Homeowner Flood Insurance Affordability Act of 2013 (H.R. 3370; 113th Congress) passed in the House on March 4, 2014. The bill delayed indefinitely some of the reforms to the deeply indebted National Flood Insurance Program. The primary issue what the premiums should be on home and business owners located in flood zones. Miller opposed the bill and argued that the state of Michigan should opt out of the National Flood Insurance Program entirely and urged the governor to do so. According to Miller, Michigan residents subsidize other, more flood prone parts of the country, by paying higher premiums than they should. Miller suggested insurance premiums of being decided by politics rather than actuarial costs. She said that "too many Americans across this nation are paying rates far below what actual risk would dictate in the marketplace while others, including many who I represent, are being forced to pay into a program that they do not need or want to help subsidize lower rates for other favored groups whose risk is far greater."

Political campaigns

1986
Miller was elected Harrison Township Supervisor in 1980, becoming the first woman and the youngest person ever to be elected to the position. In her first bid for federal office, Miller lost to 5-term incumbent Democrat David Bonior for Michigan's 12th congressional district.

1992
She was the first woman ever elected to the positions of Macomb County Treasurer and Secretary of State. Her 1992 upset of Democratic incumbent County Treasurer Adam Nowakowski was the first win for a Republican county-wide in Macomb County in more than 60 years.

1994
Miller was elected Michigan Secretary of State, unseating 6-term incumbent Richard H. Austin. She was the first Republican to serve as secretary of state in Michigan in 40 years since Owen Cleary left office in 1955.

1998
Miller carried every county in Michigan (including Wayne County, home to Detroit) and beat both Democrat Mary Parks and the Reform Party's Perry Spencer by 1 million votes, the largest margin of victory for a candidate running statewide in Michigan.

2000
Following her re-election it was reported in June 1999 that Miller, who was term-limited as Secretary of State, was considering running for Congress again, seeking a probable re-match against Bonior. She was also rumored to be considering running for the Republican nomination for governor, to succeed three-term Republican Gov. John Engler, who was term-limited. She passed on both races.

2002
After the 2000 United States Census, the Michigan Legislature reconfigured the state's congressional map. In the process, they redrew the 10th District, represented by 13-term Democrat David Bonior. The old 10th had been a fairly compact district taking in most of Macomb and St. Clair counties. However, the reconfigured 10th was pushed all the way to the Thumb. In the process, the legislature moved Miller's home in Harrison Township into the district, while shifting Bonior's home in Mount Clemens to the neighboring 12th District. Bonior opted to run for the governor of Michigan rather than run for re-election to the House of Representatives. Miller won the Republican primary unopposed, and in the general election in November she handily beat Carl Marlinga, the Macomb County Prosecutor since 1982. Marlinga called himself a "Hubert Humphrey Democrat", and Miller called herself a "George W. Bush Republican." She outraised Marlinga, and secured the Teamsters Union (but not AFL–CIO) endorsement.

2006
Miller faced no opposition in the Republican primary, and was acclaimed as the Republican candidate on August 8, 2006. In the general election Miller was challenged by Democrat Robert Denison and three third-party candidates. Miller defeated Denison 178,843 to 84,574 votes.

2008

Miller was reelected against Democratic candidate Robert Denison, Libertarian candidate Neil Kiernan Stephenson, and Green candidate Candace Caveny.

During the 2008 Presidential election, Miller endorsed Former New York City Mayor Rudy Giuliani for president. At the Michigan Republican convention, she explained, "When deciding what candidate I wanted to be our next President of the United States I knew we needed someone who would continue the fight against terrorism, who has proven leadership and who has the record and experience of managing government and improving the economy. Again and again on the most important issues facing America I came to the same conclusion, that former New York City Mayor Rudy Giuliani is the man we need to lead our nation."

Miller spoke on behalf of Senator John McCain and was a vocal supporter of Governor Sarah Palin. She was a member of Gov. Palin's "truth squad" leading up to the 2008 presidential election.

2010

Miller was challenged by Democratic nominee Henry Yanez, a Sterling Heights firefighter and paramedic. He is currently the chairman of the 10th District Democrats and was a delegate to the 2004 and 2008 Democratic National Conventions. Miller won reelection November 3, 2010 with nearly 72% of the vote, beating Yanez, two minor party candidates, and a write-in.

2012

Miller's choice for chairman of Michigan's 10th congressional district Republican committee lost to her former assistant secretary of state, Stanley Grot, a local Tea Party activist. Grot is chairman of the district committee, clerk of Shelby Township, and formerly a constituent relations representative in the Michigan Attorney General's office. He has been president of the American Polish Cultural Center.

2014

Miller was challenged by Democratic nominee Chuck Stadler and Green nominee Harley Mikkelson, but she won reelection with 68.7% of the vote.

Post-congressional career

Macomb County Public Works Commissioner
In March 2015, Miller announced she would not seek re-election to Congress, and resigned at the end of the 114th Congress. Even though she was leaving Congress, Miller insisted that her career in public service was not over.

In March 2016, Miller announced she would seek the Republican nomination for the position of Macomb County Public Works Commissioner, challenging six-term incumbent Democrat Anthony Marrocco.

Miller defeated Marrocco in the general election, taking 55 percent of the vote. Marrocco is the third 24-year incumbent that Miller has defeated in her political career, after Nowakowski and Austin. She resigned her seat in the House on December 31, 2016, in order to take office as Public Works Commissioner the next day.

On January 1, 2017, her first day as Public Works Commissioner, Miller held a press conference at the site of a sinkhole in Fraser, Michigan. Miller, alongside County Executive Mark Hackel, announced she had spoken with Gov. Rick Snyder about obtaining emergency funds from the state and said that she believed Snyder would tour the site.

Miller's first act upon taking office was placing Dino Bucci, who was a top deputy to Marrocco, on administrative leave, as he became the subject of a federal investigation along with Marrocco.

In May 2017, Miller confirmed that 10 employees from the public works department had been subpoenaed by the FBI to testify before a grand jury in a wide-ranging investigation into public corruption in Macomb County. Miller said the corruption that occurred under Marrocco was pervasive and widespread and that people used the office's resources for personal use. In November 2017, Bucci was indicted on 18 felony counts including bribery, extortion, mail fraud, money laundering and embezzlement for his role in a decade-long conspiracy alleging a "pay-to-play" scheme under Marrocco. Bucci faced up to 20 years in prison if convicted On May 27, 2020, Marrocco was indicted on two counts of extortion and one count of attempted extortion for allegedly using Bucci and other county employees to force contractors and business people who wished to do business with the Public Works Department to buy tickets to his fundraisers. Bucci pleaded guilty the next day in the United States District Court for the Eastern District of Michigan, admitting his role in Marrocco's corrupt acts.

Miller announced plans to run for re-election in June 2018 and won the GOP nomination uncontested in August 2020 and faced Democratic nominee, Toni Moceri, a former Macomb County Commissioner in the general election. Miller won re-election in a landslide, taking more than 61 percent of the vote.

Possible gubernatorial campaigns
Miller has long been courted by the Michigan Republican Party to run for Governor, with speculation on her gubernatorial aspirations dating back to 1999. Miller was considered one of the leading contenders for the Republican nomination in Michigan's 2018 gubernatorial election to succeed term-limited Republican incumbent Rick Snyder She ultimately passed on the race and announced on September 23, 2017, that she was endorsing Michigan Attorney General Bill Schuette, saying "...I think he's actually going to be the next governor."

Following her re-election as Public Works Commissioner, Miller was again at the top of the Michigan GOP to run for governor in 2022 to challenge Democratic incumbent Gov. Gretchen Whitmer. In December 2020, former Republican Lt Gov. Brian Calley said Miller was the "dream candidate" for many in the Republican Party. In January 2021, Miller announced that she would not run for governor.

Personal life
She is a graduate of Lake Shore High School of St. Clair Shores, Michigan.

Miller's husband Donald Miller served as Circuit Court judge in the 16th Circuit Court for Macomb County. He was a fighter pilot, flew combat missions in Vietnam, commanded the Selfridge Air National Guard Base and retired from the Air National Guard as a colonel. He died in January 2019 at the age of 80. Their daughter is a member of the United Auto Workers Union.

Electoral history

See also
 Women in the United States House of Representatives

References

External links
 
 
 
 Official Website

|-

|-

|-

1954 births
20th-century American politicians
20th-century American women politicians
21st-century American politicians
21st-century American women politicians
American Presbyterians
County treasurers in Michigan
Female members of the United States House of Representatives
Living people
Macomb Community College alumni
Northwood University alumni
People from St. Clair Shores, Michigan
Republican Party members of the United States House of Representatives from Michigan
Secretaries of State of Michigan
Women in Michigan politics
Women state constitutional officers of Michigan